Ptilotus auriculifolius is an herb in the Amaranthaceae family.

Distribution
Ptilotus auriculifolius is found only in Western Australia, in Beard's Eremaean Province, that is, in the IBRA regions of Gascoyne, Great Sandy Desert, Little Sandy Desert, and the Pilbara.

Taxonomy
It was first described in 1849 by Alfred Moquin-Tandon as Trichinium auriculifolium, but was redescribed in 1882 by Ferdinand von Mueller as belonging to the genus, Ptilotus.

References

External links 

 Ptilotus auriculifolius occurrence data from the Australasian Virtual Herbarium

auriculifolius
Flora of Western Australia
Taxa named by Alfred Moquin-Tandon
Eudicots of Western Australia
Plants described in 1849